HomeTown is the debut studio album by Irish band HomeTown. The album was released in Ireland on 20 November 2015 through Sony Music Entertainment. The album peaked to number 4 on the Irish Albums Chart. The album includes the singles "Where I Belong", "Cry for Help", "The Night We Met" and "Roses".

Reception
Sophie Bird from Flavour Mag called it "an outstanding album for their fans."

Singles
"Where I Belong" was released as the lead single from the album on 28 November 2014. The song peaked at number 1 on the Irish Singles Chart. 
"Cry for Help" was released as the second single from the album on 27 March 2015. The song peaked at number 1 on the Irish Singles Chart. 
"The Night We Met" was released as the third single from the album on 23 October 2015. The song peaked at number 59 on the Irish Singles Chart. 
"Roses" was released as the fourth and final single from the album in August 2016.

Track listing

Weekly charts

Release history

References

2015 debut albums
Sony Music albums